Streptomyces aridus is a bacterium species from the genus Streptomyces which has been isolated from soil from the Atacama Desert.

See also 
 List of Streptomyces species

References 

aridus
Bacteria described in 2017